Devon White may refer to:

Devon White (baseball) (born 1962), baseball player
Devon White (footballer) (born 1964), association football player
Devon White (The Office), fictional character from US TV series The Office

See also
Devin White (born 1998), American football player